The four-toed earless skink (Hemiergis peronii), also known commonly as Péron's earless skink, the lowlands earless skink, or the four-toed mulch skink, is a viviparous earless skink endemic to southern Australia.

Etymology
The specific name, peronii, is in honor of François Péron, a French naturalist and explorer.

Geographic range
H. peronii is found in coastal and subcoastal areas of the following Australian states: Western Australia, South Australia, and western Victoria.

Description

References

Further reading
Cogger HG (2014). Reptiles and Amphibians of Australia, Seventh Edition. Clayton, Victoria, Australia: CSIRO Publishing. xxx + 1,033 pp. .
Gray JE (1831). "The Animal Kingdom. Class Reptilia". In: Griffith E, Pidgeon E (1831). The Class Reptilia arranged by the Baron Cuvier with specific descriptions. (Volume IX in The Animal Kingdom series). London: Whittaker, Treacher, and Co. 481 pp. (Seps peronii, new species, p. 159).
Wilson, Steve; Swan, Gerry (2013). A Complete Guide to Reptiles of Australia, Fourth Edition. Sydney: New Holland Publishers. 522 pp. .

Hemiergis
Reptiles of Western Australia
Reptiles described in 1831
Skinks of Australia
Taxa named by John Edward Gray